Roger Warren Titus (December 16, 1941 – March 3, 2019) was an American jurist and lawyer who served as a federal judge on the U.S. District Court for the District of Maryland from 2003 until his death in 2019.

Education and career
Born on December 16, 1941, in Washington, D.C., Titus received a Bachelor of Arts degree from Johns Hopkins University in 1963 and a Juris Doctor from Georgetown University Law Center in 1966. He was a Special Legal Assistant, City of Rockville, Maryland in 1966. He was an Assistant City Attorney of City of Rockville, Maryland from 1966 to 1970. He was a City Attorney of City of Rockville, Maryland from 1970-82. He was in private practice in Maryland from 1967 to 2003. He was an Adjunct Professor, Georgetown University Law Center from 1972 to 1978.

Federal judicial service

Titus was nominated by President George W. Bush on June 18, 2003, to a seat on the United States District Court for the District of Maryland vacated by Marvin J. Garbis. He was confirmed by the United States Senate on November 5, 2003, and received his commission on November 6, 2003. Titus assumed senior status on January 17, 2014. He died on March 3, 2019, of complications of liposarcoma, at a hospital in Washington, D.C.

References

Sources
 

1941 births
2019 deaths
Bethesda-Chevy Chase High School alumni
Georgetown University Law Center alumni
Georgetown University Law Center faculty
Johns Hopkins University alumni
Judges of the United States District Court for the District of Maryland
Lawyers from Washington, D.C.
Maryland lawyers
People from Rockville, Maryland 
United States district court judges appointed by George W. Bush
21st-century American judges
Deaths from cancer in Washington, D.C.
Deaths from liposarcoma
Maryland city attorneys